The Fountain of Neptune in Florence, Italy, is situated in the Piazza della Signoria (Signoria square), in front of the Palazzo Vecchio. The fountain was commissioned by Cosimo I de' Medici in 1559 to celebrate the marriage of Francesco de' Medici I to Grand Duchess Joanna of Austria. Cosimo I de' Medici was the Duke of Florence from 1537-1569 and responsible for a vast number of architectural and artistic elements in Florence that still exist today.

The fountain was designed by Baccio Bandinelli, but created by Bartolomeo Ammannati with the assistance of several other artists between 1560 and 1574. It incorporates a series of mythological figures and iconographies that symbolize both Cosimo I de' Medici's power and the union of Francesco and Joanna.

It has sustained a great deal of damage over the years due to vandalism and general mistreatment but underwent a major restoration completed in 2019 that restored it to its original glory.

History

Creation
In 1559, Cosimo I de' Medici held a competition to select an artist to build the Fountain Of Neptune. The fountain was commissioned both in celebration of Cosimo's gift of clean water to the city and to celebrate the marriage of Francesco de' Medici I to the Grand Duchess Joanna of Austria. Don Vincenzo Borghini was Cosimo's iconographer and responsible for overseeing the project. The commission was originally granted to Baccio Bandinelli, but after his untimely death in 1560, before the project began, the commission was given to his student Bartolomeo Ammannati. This was the second commission Ammannati had received from Cosimo; his first commission was for the Grand Hall Fountain which was in celebration of Cosimo successfully bringing fresh water into the city. Ammannati created The Fountain of Neptune based on the designs drawn by Bandinelli. Although Ammannati was the fountain's main sculptor he was assisted by several artists throughout the  completion from 1560-1574. Some of the artists include Vincenzo de' Rossi, who cast the four satyrs, and the Flemish artist Giambologna. Rossi was also commissioned by Cosimo to create the Labors of Hercules after he lost the competition for the Neptune project. The sculptors who assisted in carving the giant marble Neptune were Andrea Calamech, Battista Fiammeri, and Cesare di Nicodemo.

The Fountain of Neptune consists of many different parts; aside from the giant Neptune atop a shell-shaped horse-drawn chariot, the fountain also has Tritons, Satyrs, two young women with Putti, two young men with dolphins, and Fauns. Neptune's features were modeled after Cosimo I de' Medici, which was appropriate parallel due to Cosimo's recent victory over Pisa, giving Florence safe access to the Mediterranean for trade. Ammannati's Neptune was unique because of its incredibly large scale and even though there were several Neptune fountains around Italy at the time, none of them had Neptune atop a horse-drawn chariot. The fountain was being built to celebrate the marriage of Francesco and Joanna, and the association of chariots with festivals and pageants could be the reason for Bandinelli's unusual incorporation of a horse-chariot. Because the fountain's scale was so large, it forced Ammannati to make some innovative choices when constructing his giant Neptune. Two of the horses were white marble, but the other two were made of mischio, a marble discovered near the Duke's excavation site in Seravezza. This new marble was a type of breccia and had a variety of colors including red, yellow and purple. Because this was a new medium, its qualities were unknown to sculptors at the time and the hard, brittle quality of the mischio made Ammannait's task even more difficult. Due to the brittle quality of mischio the columns of stone broke in transit, creating delays in the fountain's completion. Ammannati was finally able to carve the remainder of the horse and complete the fountain in 1574. The project was intended to be completed by 1565 for the celebration of Francesco de' Medici I and Joanna of Austria's wedding, but due to a myriad of delays in sourcing supplies for the fountain's completion, Ammannati was forced to come up with a temporary solution for the arrival of Johanna of Austria. Through the use of stucco and paint, Ammannati was able to create the illusion of a finished product. The combination of the Neptune as the subject matter and Ammannati's use of the duke's newly found stone (mischio) made the fountain symbolic of the duke's reign over the Mediterranean and the mountains.

Patron
Cosimo I de' Medici, Duke of Florence from 1537-1569, was largely responsible for shaping Florence into the city of the art and architecture that still stands today. Because of the significant transformation Florence underwent during his reign, Cosimo was often compared to Augustus and considered himself to be the architect of the new age of Florence. Some of Cosimo's most significant contributions to Florence include: The Sala Grande in the Palazzo Della Signoria, the Uffizi, the Fountain of Neptune, the Boboli Gardens, completing the Pitti Palace, and renovating churches such as Santa Maria Novella and Santa Croce. Although Cosimo contributed extensively to the city, it was not without personal gain. Cosimo's patronage was not only to provide public spaces and art for the citizens to enjoy, but it was also for his own political interests. His renovation of the churches were driven by a desire to gain favor with Rome and earn a grand ducal crown, which he received in 1569. The festivals he held between 1560 and 1574 were orchestrated to please the masses, while in turn, glorifying his reign. Behind Cosimo's commissions was an underlying glorification of the Medici Dynasty and his reign over Florence.  Cosimo was not only a patron of the arts but he also freed Florence from imperial authority and established himself as lord of the new state of Florence.

Vandalism and Restoration 
The Fountain of Neptune began to suffer damages from almost the moment it was unveiled. Shortly after the unveiling, locals began to use the fountain as a washbasin for inkpots and laundry, causing a damage and discoloration to the marble.  The fountain suffered a great deal of vandalism between 1580-1989. In 1580, almost the entire fountain was vandalized, leaving only a few figures untouched. The fountain was then damaged during celebrations in 1830 and 1848. Over the course of the 1980s there were several occasions in which the horses were damaged and another incident where Neptune's shoulder was painted after Italy won the World Cup in 1982. Finally, on August 3, 2005, a vandal attempted to climb Neptune which resulted in the loss of a hand, a broken trident and damage to the chariot.  As a result of the damage the fountain endured over the years, the city implemented stricter security measures in 2007 and 2009 by installing CCTV and increasing police patrols to help prevent vandalism.

The Ferragamo family have long been patrons of the arts and have donated copious amounts of money towards the restoration of Florentine art. Salvatore Ferragamo played a large role in the 2019 restoration of the Fountain of Neptune by donating 1.5 million euros to the project. Because of the new Art Bonus program started in 2014, private donors such as Ferragamo are now able to receive a tax deduction for any donations made toward the city's art restoration efforts. Thanks to Ferragamo's generous donation, the long overdue restoration of the fountain began in early 2017 and was completed in 2019. During the restoration the pump that had not functioned since 1987 was finally replaced with a new stainless-steel system. Other repairs included removing stains from the marble, patching cracks and restoring rusted bronze figures.

Mythology 

At first glance, the Zodiac signs engraved on Neptune's chariot follow a traditional pattern starting with Aries and ending with Virgo; however, after closer examination, the depiction of Virgo does not follow a traditional representation of Virgo as Virgin, but instead depicts her as a bride. Additionally, Virgo is presented with a unicorn seated on her lap. The combination of these two unusual elements alludes to biblical symbolism. These two figures are anointing this fountaining as a baptistry and proclaiming the water's purity. Philosophers such as Andrea Bacci suggest that the Virgo in Ammannati's fountain is representing Christ's bride and the unicorn represents the Christ child. Due to the well-established association of purity with both Virgo and unicorns, Ammannati's combination of these two figures creates a clear representation of Christ's purity. In Greek mythology, the unicorn's purity was so strong that even by placing the tip of its horn in water, it could purify the most toxic water. In Virgo's right hand we see a loaf of bread where an ear of corn usually lies, furthering the idea that this fountain is being proclaimed as a baptistry.

The representation of Neptune in the Renaissance is particularly interesting because unlike many of the other Olympian deities, there were no surviving classical sculptures depicting Neptune available to artists in the Renaissance. This meant that the representation of Neptune was based upon the artist's personal interpretation of what he should look like. Because of this, the Italian representation of Neptune was different than that of Greek tradition. Unlike Neptune in Greek mythology, the Italian interpretation of Neptune was more human than god, much like Hercules. Over the course of the fifteenth century three main representations of Neptune emerged: static which was popular between the 1530s through 1560s, dynamic which was popular between 1504 and 1566, and synthesized which was an amalgamation of the two styles. The Neptune in Ammannati's Fountain was built in a static style, standing atop his chariot of horses. The representation of Neptune in static style was popular in Florence at the time and was frequently used in fountains; however, there are two elements worth noting that made Ammannati's representation of Neptune slightly different than others. Ammannati's Neptune is wearing a crown and holding a lash in his right hand. Both the crown and the lash were a reference to earthly rulers, making this specific representation of Neptune symbolic of a contemporary ruler i.e. Cosimo I de' Medici, rather than an Olympian deity.

Similar statuary 
Cosimo I de' Medici commissioned a second Fountain of Neptune in 1565. This second fountain was a bronze sculpture created by Stoldo Lorenzi and was placed in the main axis of the Boboli Garden behind the Palazzo Pitti in Florence and was a symbol of the Medici's power over Florence. Another Fountain of Neptune lies in Bologna's Piazza Maggiore. This fountain was commissioned by Cardinal Legate Charles Borromeo and was built between 1563-1566 by a nameless Flemish artist known as Giambologna who also assisted with The Fountain of Neptune in Florence.

Gallery

Notes

References
 Carter, Mary (30 July 2013). "Three Months in Florence". Kensington Books. p. 59.  – via Google Books.
 Crum, Rodger J.; Paoletti, John T. (April 2006). Renaissance Florence: A Social History. Cambridge University Press. p. 133.  – via Google Books.
 Else, Felicia M. (July 2005). "La Maggior Porcheria Del Mondo': Documents for Ammannati's Neptune Fountain". Burlington Magazines Publications. 147: 487–491 – via JSTOR.
 Else, Felicia M. (2011). "Moving Stones, Managing Waterways, and Building an Empire for Duke Cosimo I de' Medici". The Sixteenth Century Journal. 42: 393–425 – via JSTOR.
 Freedman, Luba (Fall 1995). "Neptune in classical and Renaissance visual art". International Journal of the Classical Tradition. 2 (2): 219–237. doi:10.1007/bf02678622. ISSN 1073-0508 – via JSTOR.
 Grippi, Rosalind (1956). "A Sixteenth Century Bozzetto". The Art Bulletin. 38: 143–147 – via JSTOR.
 "Italian Neptune statue loses hand". BBC News. August 2005.
 Kren, Emil; Marx, Daniel (eds.). "GIAMBOLOGNA". Web Gallery of Art.
 Mandle, Corinne (Summer 1995). "AN AUTOGRAPH SATYR BY VINCENZO DE' ROSSI ON THE NEPTUNE FOUNTAIN IN FLORENCE". The University of Chicago Press. 14 (4): 26–33 – via JSTOR.
 Mandel, Corinne (Fall 2001). "THE ZODIACAL VIRGO ON THE NEPTUNE FOUNTAIN IN FLORENCE". Source: Notes in the History of Art. 21 (1): 10–16. doi:10.1086/sou.21.1.23206970. ISSN 0737-4453 – via JSTOR.
 McGee, Anna (12 July 2016). "New life for the Neptune Fountain - The Florentine". Theflorentine.net. Retrieved 9 August 2018.
 Morris, Roderick Conway (August 12, 2011). "In Florence, Revelations in Stone". Nytimes.com. Retrieved 9 August 2018.
 Paoletti, John. T; Radke, Gary M. (9 August 2018). Art in Renaissance Italy. London, United Kingdom: Laurence King Publishing. p. 460. – via Google Books.
 Paolucci, Raffaella; Tanganelli, Marco; Verdiani; Giorgio (2018). Great Statues and Seismic Vulnerability–A Photogrammetric Approach for Early Safeguard (PDF). Vienna: Museen der Stadt Wien – Stadtarchäologie. .
 "Palazzo Vecchio and Piazza Signoria - Florence". Museumsinflorence.com. Retrieved 9 August 2018.
 "Romaviva.com: Hotel a Roma - Prenota ora Alberghi e B&B Roma". Roma Viva. Archived from the original on 6 March 2009. Retrieved 9 August 2018.
 Pirro, Dierdre (19 May 2011). "The White Giant - The Florentine". Theflorentine.net. Retrieved 9 August 2018.
 Salibian, Sandra (March 26, 2019). "Salvatore Ferragamo Unveils Restored Fountain of Neptune in Florence". Women's Wear Daily.
 "The Fountain of Neptune under restoration - Florence Daily News". Florencedailynews.com. 27 February 2017. Retrieved 9 August 2018.
 Utz, Hildegard (May 1973). "A Note on Ammannati's Apennine and on the Chronology of the Figures for His Fountain of Neptune". The Burlington Magazine. 115: 295–300 – via JSTOR.
 Van Veen, Henk Th. (2006). Cosimo I de' Medici and His Self-Representation in Florentine Art and Culture. New York: Cambridge University Press. .

External links
 

Renaissance sculptures
1560s sculptures
1570s sculptures
Neptune
Tourist attractions in Florence
Vandalized works of art in Italy
Horses in art
Fish in art
Sculptures of Neptune
Sculptures by Giambologna